Hylocomiastrum is a genus of mosses belonging to the family Hylocomiaceae.

Species:
 Hylocomiastrum himalayanum (Mitt.) Broth.
 Hylocomiastrum pyrenaicum (Spruce) M. Fleisch.
 Hylocomiastrum umbratum (Ehrh. ex Hedw.) M. Fleisch.

References

Hypnales
Moss genera